Chromerida is a phylum of unicellular alveolates, which includes photosynthetic species Chromera velia and Vitrella brassicaformis. General features of the phylum include spherical cells each with a thick cell wall, chloroplast present with chlorophyll a only (no chlorophyll b or c), and an internal developing flagellum at some lifestages.

They often live in close association with corals, and studies suggest their closest relatives is the parasitic group Apicomplexa, which evolved from photosynthetic ancestors, making Chromerida the last remaining photosynthetic members of an otherwise parasitic branch within Alveolata.

Carter Lab at University of Sydney has undertaken new experiments to isolate novel Chromerids, using the same methods that were used to isolate Chromera velia and Vitrella brassicaformis. These methods were agreed at the First Chromera Conference and Workshop held at the Heron Island Research Station, Queensland, Australia from November 21–25, 2011.

References

Sources

 
SAR supergroup phyla